The Central Bank of Mauritania (BCM) is the central bank of Mauritania, in northwest Africa. The bank is located in the capital Nouakchott, just south of the presidential palace. Its current governor is Cheikh El Kebir Moulay Taher.

History
The bank was created by acts of the legislature of Mauritania, in 1973, 1974 and 1975. It was established by President Moktar Ould Daddah after he withdrew Mauritania from the French-dominated monetary consortium, the Communauté Financière Africaine.

Governors
Ahmed Ould Daddah, June 1973 - May 1978
Sid Ahmed Ould Bneijara, May 1978 - July 1978
Dieng Boubou Farba, July 1978 - April 1981
Ahmed Ould Zein, April 1981 - July 1983
Dieng Boubou Farba, July 1983 - September 1987
Mohamed Ould Nany, September 1987 - April 1988
Ahmed Ould Zein, April 1988 - June 1992
Moustapha Ould Abeiderrahmane, June 1992 - June 1993
Mohamedou Ould Michel, June 1993 - December 1997
Mahfoudh Ould Mohamed Aly, December 1997 - January 2001
Sid El Moctar Ould Nagi, January 2001 - August 2002
Yahya Ould Athighe, August 2002 - January 2003
Ba Seydou Moussa, January 2003 - June 2003
Ahmed Salem Ould Tebakh, June 2003 - July 2004
Zein Ould Zeidane, July 2004 - September 2006
Kane Ousmane, September 2006 - November 2008
Sidatty Benhameyda, November 2008 - August 2009
Sid Ahmed Ould Raiss, August 2009 - January 2015
Abdel Aziz Ould Dahi, January 2015 - January 2020
Cheikh El Kebir Moulay Taher, January 2020 - March 2022
Mohamed Lemine Ould Dhehby, March 2022 - 
Source:

See also

 Mauritanian ouguiya
 Economy of Mauritania
 List of central banks of Africa
 List of central banks

References

"Missions" page at Banque Centrale de Mauritanie website

External links
 

Banks of Mauritania
Economy of Mauritania
Mauritania
Nouakchott
Banks established in 1973
1973 establishments in Mauritania